Lectionary 167, designated by siglum ℓ 167 (in the Gregory-Aland numbering) is a Greek manuscript of the New Testament, on paper leaves. Palaeographically it has been assigned to the 15th century. 
Formerly it was labelled as Lectionary 63a. Scrivener designated it by 61a.

Description 

The codex contains Lessons from the Acts and Epistles lectionary (Apostolarion) with lacunae at the beginning.

The text is written in Greek minuscule letters, on 75 paper leaves (26.3 cm by 18.3 cm), in one columns per page, 17 lines per page.

History 

The manuscript was examined by Bloomfield and Gregory.

The manuscript is not cited in the critical editions of the Greek New Testament (UBS3).

Currently the codex is located in the Lambeth Palace (1195) at London.

See also 

 List of New Testament lectionaries
 Biblical manuscript
 Textual criticism

Notes and references 

Greek New Testament lectionaries
15th-century biblical manuscripts